The Los Angeles Marathon (formerly known as the City of Los Angeles Marathon) is an annual running event typically held each spring in Los Angeles, California, since 1986.  The marathon was inspired by the success of the 1984 Summer Olympic Games hosted in Los Angeles, and has become one of the largest marathons in the country, with more than 25,000 participants, thousands of volunteers, and hundreds of thousands of spectators.

Since 2020, the event has been sponsored by Asics and is officially titled the Los Angeles Marathon presented by ASICS.

History

Municipal Games era 

In 1970, a race of length  was held in Los Angeles.

In 1971, the race was lengthened to the distance of a standard marathon, and known as the "Griffith Park Marathon".  It was held at the same time as the Municipal Games.

The 1972 race was known as the "Municipal Games Marathon", while races from 1973 to 1977 were known as the "Los Angeles Marathon", and the 1978 edition was known as the "Los Angeles Police Marathon".

The Association of Road Racing Statisticians (ARRS) has no record of any races in this series after 1978.

Los Angeles Lite era 

The inaugural race in 1981, known as the "Jordache Los Angeles Pro-Am Marathon", was run with two sections, a professional section with 100,000 USD in prize money, and an amateur section.

Both the 1982 and 1983 races were known as the "Los Angeles Lite Marathon".

In 1983, runners were misdirected, but the course was changed to ensure that finishers ran at least a marathon.

ARRS has no record of any races in this series after 1983.

Current era 

The inaugural marathon of the current series was first held in 1986.

In 1997, Nadezhda Ilyina crossed the finish line first, but was disqualified for cutting the course through a service station.  The victory went to Ilyina's friend and first-time marathoner Lornah Kiplagat.

The race date for 2009 was moved to Memorial Day, because the city council wished "to limit the impact on Sunday morning church services".  After runner criticism due to the increased probability of warmer weather, the race date was moved back to March for the 2010 race.

The 34th edition of the marathon took place on March 24, 2019.

The 2021 edition of the race was postponed to November 7 due to the coronavirus pandemic, with all registrants given the option of running the race virtually or transferring their entry to 2022, 2023, or 2024.

Course 

The original route in 1986 started at Exposition Park and ended at the Los Angeles Memorial Coliseum.

The route around the turn of the millennium both started and ended in Downtown Los Angeles.

From 2007 to 2008, it started south of Universal City and ended in Downtown Los Angeles.

The iconic "Stadium to Sea" route started at Dodger Stadium and ended in Santa Monica.

The course was changed in the middle of 2020  to end at Avenue of the Stars in Century City due to "dramatically increased costs quoted by the city of Santa Monica" to continue hosting the finish there.

Community impact 

In 2014, the Los Angeles Marathon charity program continued its tremendous growth as 91 participating charities combined to raise a cumulative total $3.7 million.

Students Run LA
In 1987, six students at East Los Angeles’ Boyle Heights High School enrolled in a marathon training program offered by teacher Harry Shabazian. On March 4, 1990, two dozen teachers from around the city joined the three co-founders, with students from their respective schools, and together, they all ran in the Los Angeles Marathon V. In 1993, Students Run LA spun off from LAUSD and became an independent 501(c)(3) organization. SRLA continues to provide its after-school mentoring and training program to all students for free. Today, more than 3,200 middle and high school students, from 185 school and community programs, train alongside 550 volunteer leaders.

Inspired by the success of SRLA, a pilot project was begun with the Montreal Marathon and Students on the run (Étudiants dans la course) was created with the first objective to complete the September 2010 Montreal Marathon. There were 19 students to begin with and 12 completed the 2010 event. The program continues with a new group and a new objective, complete the 2011 event.

Legacy Runners
Each year, the marathon honors Legacy Runners, runners who have finished every Los Angeles Marathon since its inception in 1986.  Each Legacy Runner receives a special bib with a permanent bib number.

As of 2020, there were 114 Legacy Runners.

Television coverage
From 1986 to 2001 KCOP-TV televised the Los Angeles Marathon, in 2002, KCAL-TV, from 2003 to 2007, KNBC and from 2008 to present, KTLA.

Since 2017, the event has been carried nationally on WGN America except in Los Angeles.

Top finishers

Ages of top finishers in the Masters category are given in parentheses.

Key:

Notes

References

 2000–2007 Results (source of ages of masters winners)
 2007 Results (source of masters winners 2005–2007)
 2006 Results
 2005 Results
 2004 Results
 2003 Results
 2000 Results

External links
 Los Angeles Marathon
 

 
Recurring sporting events established in 1986
Foot races in California
Sports competitions in Los Angeles
Marathons in California
Marathons in the United States
Annual sporting events in the United States
1986 establishments in California